The Campeonato Regional Centro (Spanish for Central Regional Championship) was an important annual association football competition for clubs based primarily in the Castile region of Spain, including the Community of Madrid, during the first half of the 20th century. The competition was organised by the  Madrid Football Federation and first held in 1903 as the Campeonato de Madrid (Madrid Championship) and renamed as the Campeonato Regional de Madrid (Madrid Regional Championship) for the 1906–13 seasons. The Royal Spanish Football Federation, founded on 29 September 1913, began organising the competition from 1913. It was called the Campeonato Regional Centro between 1913 and 1931, the Campeonato Regional Mancomunado (Joint Championship) from 1932 to 1936, and the Campeonato Regional del Centro (Regional Championship of the Centre) during its final season in 1939–40.

History
The competition was founded in 1903 and run by the local regional federation, the Madrid Association of Foot-ball Clubs ( or FMF). From 1903 to 1913, it was referred to as "Campeonato de Madrid" and was open to clubs based in Spain.

In 1913 the Royal Spanish Football Federation ( or RFEF) was established to govern competitions at the national level and the FMF was re-established as one of its regional branches, named Federación Castellana de Fútbol (FCF). As part of the country-wide reorganisation the competition was also re-established as "Campeonato Regional". In the following years it was one of the four regional competitions used as a qualifying phase for the Copa del Rey (which acted as the national championship of Spain until the foundation of La Liga in 1929). The four regional competitions were territorially organized as follows:

Región Norte (Álava, Biscay, Gipuzkoa, Navarre and Rioja).
Region Centro (Castile and Andalucia).
Región Este (Catalonia, Valencia, Alicante and Murcia).
Región Oeste (Santander, Asturias and Galicia)

With changes in territorial organization and several renamings (see below), these regional competitions were contested until 1940 when they were disbanded during Franco's dictatorship.

Format changes
From 1903 to 1913 the competition was contested by clubs from Madrid. From the 1913–14 season onwards it expanded to include teams from six neighboring provinces (Ávila, Ciudad Real, Cuenca, Guadalajara, Segovia and Toledo). The territorial format remained largely unchanged until the last season in 1939–1940, with minor changes listed below.

List of winners

Campeonato de Madrid
1903 Moderno
1903–04 Español Madrid
1904–05 Madrid
1905–06 Madrid
Campeonato Regional de Madrid
1906–07 Madrid
1907–08 Madrid
1908–09 Español Madrid
1909–10 RS Gimnástica
1910–11 RS Gimnástica
1911–12 Not held
1912–13 Madrid

Campeonato Regional Centro
1913–14 RS Gimnástica
1914–15 Racing Madrid
1915–16 Madrid
1916–17 Madrid
1917–18 Madrid
1918–19 Racing Madrid
1919–20 Madrid
1920–21 Athletic Madrid
1921–22 Real Madrid
1922–23 Real Madrid
1923–24 Real Madrid
1924–25 Athletic Madrid
1925–26 Real Madrid

1926–27 Real Madrid
1927–28 Athletic Madrid
1928–29 Real Madrid
1929–30 Real Madrid
1930–31 Real Madrid
1931–32 Madrid
1932–33 Madrid
1933–34 Madrid
1934–35 Madrid
1935–36 Madrid
1936–37 Not held due to the Spanish Civil War 
1937–38 Not held due to the Spanish Civil War
1938–39 Not held due to the Spanish Civil War
Campeonato Regional del Centro
1939–40 Athletic Madrid

Performances by club
Madrid / Real Madrid: 23
 1903, 1904–05, 1905–06, 1906–07, 1907–08, 1912–13, 1915–16, 1916–17, 1917–18, 1919–20, 1921–22, 1922–23, 1923–24, 1925–26, 1926–27, 1928–29, 1929–30, 1930–31, 1931–32, 1932–33, 1933–34, 1934–35, 1935–36
Athletic Madrid / Athletic Aviación : 4
1920–21, 1924–25, 1927–28, 1939–40
RS Gimnástica :  3
1909–10, 1910–11, 1913–14
Español Madrid :  2
1903-04, 1908–09
Racing Madrid :  2
1914–15, 1918–19

1903

1903–04
The 1903–04 Campeonato de Madrid served as a qualifier to determine who would represent the Community of Madrid in the 1903 Copa del Rey. Originally, Madrid was to be represented by the winner of a preliminary round between Club Español de Madrid and Madrid-Moderno (a merger of Madrid FC and Moderno FC). Then two more teams from Madrid, Moncloa FC and Iberia Football Club, were admitted in the competition, forcing a change to the schedule.

The match between Club Español de Madrid and Madrid-Moderno ended in a 5–5 draw. The captains of both teams agreed not to play extra-time, but failed to reach an agreement on when they should replay the match. Español wanted to play the next day, but Madrid-Moderno refused, citing the rules of the tournament which stated that a replay could not be played less than 48 hours after the previous game. The next day Club Español went to replay the match, but Madrid-Moderno did not appear. The regional federation, whose president Ceferino Avecilla happened to be president of Club Español as well, ruled in favor of Español, and they were declared winners of the match eliminating Madrid-Moderno from the competition.

1904–05
The 1904–05 Campeonato de Madrid was played as a single elimination match between Madrid FC and Moncloa FC, with the winner representing Madrid in the 1904 Copa del Rey.

1905–06
The 1905–06 Campeonato de Madrid was played as a single elimination match between Madrid FC and FC Internacional, with the winner representing Madrid in the 1906 Copa del Rey.

1906–07
The Madrid Football Federation suspended the results of the 1906–07 season's matches for breach of norms.

1907–08

1908–09

1909–10

1912–13

1913–14
The Campeonato Regional Centro was organized by the Royal Spanish Football Federation from the 1913–14 season. Teams were split into two divisions - 1a categoría A (1st category A) and 1a categoría B (1st category B). Madrid FC, Athletic Madrid and RS Gimnástica Española were placed in 1st category A and Unión Sporting, Regional FC, Credut Lyonnais, Cardenal Cisneros were placed in 1st category B. There was no system of promotion or relegation between the divisions.

1914–15
Newly founded Racing de Madrid was added to the Campeonato Regional Centro top division for the 1914–15 season.

1915–16

1916–17
This was the first season in which a club was promoted to the first division from the second division. Stadium FC won the 1st category B at the end of the 1916–17 season and following the play-off matches, the club secured promotion to 1st category A for the 1917–18 season.

1917–18
A third division below the 1st category B, called 2ª Preferente (2nd Preferential) was introduced for the 1917–18 season. The division included Recreativo Español, Madrid FC's third reserve team, and Unión SC's second reserve team.

This was the first season in which a club was relegated to the second division. Stadium FC, who had been newly promoted to the 1st category A, finished at the bottom of the table qualifying for the relegation play-offs with Unión SC, winner of the 1st category B. Unión SC won two of the three play-off matches between the teams earning promotion to the 1st category A, while Stadium FC was relegated to 1st category B for the 1918–19 season.

1918–19

1919–20

1920–21

1921–22

1922–23

1923–24
The Federation expanded the number of teams included in the first division to five and the second division to six from the 1923–24 season. Unión SC, winner of the second division in the previous season, was promoted to the first division.

1924–25

1925–26

1926–27

1927–28

1928–29

1929–30

1930–31

1931–32 (Campeonato Mancomunado Centro-Aragón)

1932–33 (Campeonato Regional Mancomunado Centro-Sur)

1933–34 (Campeonato Regional Mancomunado Centro-Sur)

1934–35 (Campeonato Mancomunado Castilla-Aragón)

1935–36 (Campeonato Mancomunado Castilla-Aragón)
Champion: Madrid FC

1936 to 1939
The competition was not held for three seasons due to the Spanish Civil War.

1939–40
Champion: Athletic Aviación

See also
History of Real Madrid CF
Madrid autonomous football team

References

Football in the Community of Madrid
Defunct football leagues in Spain
Football in Castile and León
Football in Castilla–La Mancha
Sports leagues established in 1903
Sports leagues disestablished in 1940
1903 establishments in Spain
1940 disestablishments in Spain
History of football in Spain